The Arba'een Pilgrimage, or the Arba'een Walk or Karbala Walk, is the world's largest annual public gathering. It is held at Karbala, Iraq at the end of the 40-day mourning period following Ashura, the religious ritual for the commemoration of martyrdom of the grandson of the Islamic prophet Muhammad and the third Shia Muslim Imam, Husayn ibn Ali's in 61 AH (680 AD). He is believed to transcend all cultural boundaries and be a symbol of universal freedom, compassion and social justice. Anticipating Arbaʽeen, or the fortieth day of the martyrdom, the pilgrims make their journey to Karbala on foot, where Husayn and his companions were betrayed by the very people who invited him to Kufa, Iraq, and then subsequently martyred and beheaded by the army of Ubayd Allah ibn Ziyad in the Battle of Karbala.

The number of participants in the annual pilgrimage reached 25 million by 2017. On the routes of the pilgrimage, food, accommodation and other services are provided for free by volunteers.

The ritual has been described as "an overwhelmingly powerful display of Shia belief and solidarity". Iran and Shias however have criticized mainstream media for ignoring the event.

Background
Jabir ibn Abd Allah alongside Atiyah ibn Sa'd were the first pilgrims of Husayn ibn Ali in the Arba'een of 61 AH (AD 680). According to narrations, the custom of performing the pilgrimage on foot was forgotten during a time period after Morteza Ansari and it was revived by Mirza Husain Noori Tabarsi in an Eid al-Adha who repeated this action every year performing the last one by 1319 AH (AD 1901). Some other scholars and Marja's kept on the same manner in Arba'een up to the Saddam's time during which the pilgrimage was banned although a small number of people used to perform it secretly. It was revived just after Saddam's overthrow in 2003 and the number of participants grew year after year reaching 20 million pilgrims by 2016.

Features

"Shia cities, towns and villages all over Iraq empty out" during the 20-day period of the pilgrimage "as their people take to the roads in an elaborately organised and well protected mass movement not seen anywhere else in the world". By 2014, over 19 million people from 40 countries of the world participated in this occasion, making it the second largest gathering in the world. The figure reached 22 million pilgrims by 2015, according to Iraqi state-run media. By 2016, according to al-Khoei Foundation, almost 22 million pilgrims gathered in Iraq, 10% more than 2014. Even though the Hindu Kumbh Mela is larger in population, it is only held every four years, and hence the Arba'een pilgrimage is the largest gathering held annually.

The pilgrimage is marked by long walks from Najaf or Basra to Karbala. People from different walks of life, ethnicity and sect participate in the march including toddlers in prams and elderly pushed in armchairs. 

Husayn ibn Ali, the Muslim saint for whom the pilgrimage is made, is believed to transcend all cultural boundaries and be a symbol of universal freedom and compassion. The mood of the pilgrimage has also been described as "one of intense piety and communal solidarity".

Free services 
During the pilgrimage "copious supplies of food, small clinics and even dentists are available for pilgrims and they all work for free. The care of pilgrims is regarded as a religious duty." Along the roads to Karbala, many mawakibs (tents) are devised with the aim of providing "accommodation, food and beverage and medical services", and practically anything else the pilgrims need for free.

The pilgrims carry flags of different color but the black flag of mourning for Imam Hussein is by far the most common. They also decorate "permanent brick buildings and temporary tents which are used for praying, eating and sleeping along the three main routes leading to Kerbala". Seven thousand of such mawakeb were set up in city of Karbala in 2014. Besides Iraqi mawakibs, which are unofficially organized, there are some ian ones which are less "specifically targeted" but pilgrims are from various regions.

Ali Moamen, Academic and former director of Al Najaf Satellite TV Channel, said:

According to Sayed Mahdi al-Modarresi, writing for The Huffington Post:

Comparison to Hajj 
The Arba'een pilgrimage is non-obligatory compared to Hajj which is obligatory for those who can afford it. But tight regulation of Hajj because of its narrow and limited spaces have driven up costs and depriving it of spontaneity seen in Arba'een, making the latter an alternative for Muslims who cannot afford Hajj. Arba'een attracts more pilgrims than Hajj.

Security arrangements 
The pilgrims face dangers such as "attacks that have been blamed on Sunni extremists, who have routinely targeted the pilgrims" using car bombs or rockets. The pilgrimage is performed under "tightened security" guarded by tens of thousands of Iraqi police and soldiers backed by armored vehicles and military helicopters to protect the pilgrims. Iranian advisers also help protect the visitors through a joint operation room. On 20 November 2015, a major bombing plot in Hussainiya in Iraq, Baghdad was foiled by the Iraqi police, where 18 booby-trapped dolls were seized by the security forces. Stuffed with bombs, the dolls were meant to be scattered on the roads leading to Karbala during Arbaʽeen.

Political dimensions

The ritual is no longer considered a purely cultural ceremony while ISIL, the group who regards Shia as apostate, had launched a wide offensive in Iraq, and hence the presence of such a large population of Shia is of a political importance. According to Ali Mamouri writing in Al-Monitor, the pilgrimage became "a show of force against those hostile to the rise of the Shia in the region". After the fall of Mosul to the ISIL "and the subsequent massacres of Shia soldiers and civilians", the gathering took a political form for the first time for the Shia, who use the mourning rituals as a way to condemn injustice and express their social power. "The second sign of Arba'een's political shift was the regional message conveyed by Shia to their opponents: The Shia Crescent," Mamouri added. As the third sign he pointed to "a message exchanged between regional forces" and "unprecedented Iranian presence" which has led to "a feeling of solidarity between Arab and non-Arab Shia".

Surveys are done to study Shi'a Muslims via both "traditional survey instruments and experimental methods". The survey included topics such as "religion and politics, democracy, women's rights, regional conflict and Iran's nuclear agreement". Experimental methods were employed to investigate the "latent perspectives" of pilgrims towards "sensitive topics", including "Iran's nuclear program, and attitudes toward the West, China and Russia".

In the media

Allegations of media blackout 
Iranian media, officials, religious figures and citizens have accused the Western media for ignoring the pilgrimage despite its large scale and its geopolitical and cultural significance. Despite being even larger than Hajj, the most important Muslim pilgrimage to Mecca, the Arba'een Pilgrimage remains largely unknown to the world.

Asharq al-Awsat false report 
In 2016, Asharq al-Awsat, a daily paper based in London, claimed the World Health Organization (WHO) reported that "unplanned pregnancies and [...] disease" were seen "following the arrival of scores of unregulated Iranians to take part in the annual Shia pilgrimage to Karbala", in reference to the Arba'een Pilgrimage. According to the article, 169 unmarried women had become pregnant from the Iranian pilgrims. This report was later proven to be false.

The WHO Regional Office for the Eastern Mediterranean rejected the claims reported in Asharq al-Awsat and condemned the inclusion of its name, calling it "unfounded" news. In a television interview, a spokeswoman for the WHO said that the organization was "shocked" by Asharq al-Awsat's report and said that they were discussing with the Iraqi Ministry of Health on taking legal action against the paper. Prime Minister of Iraq Haider al-Abadi and other Shiite leaders condemned the report and demanded an "apology".

Around the world
Outside of Iraq, the pilgrimage is performed annually around the world in countries such as, Iran, Nigeria, the United Kingdom, and the United States.

United Kingdom
The Husaini Islamic Trust UK organizes a procession in United Kingdom which draws an attendance of thousands of people. In 2015, the organizers condemned terrorism following the November 2015 Paris attacks. The organizer said that the procession failed to gain coverage by the mainstream media because of "stereotyping", saying that "people see the entire Muslim community as one community."

Nigeria
Pilgrims in West Africa who are unable to go to Karbala due to the distance involved instead head toward Zaria in Kaduna, Nigeria to be addressed by the Shia cleric Ibrahim Zakzaky. These include pilgrims from Nigeria as well as Ghana, Chad, Cameroon, Benin and Togo.

On 5 October 2017, this annual Arba'een trek was attacked by Kano police, resulting in the death of a religious leader and injury to dozens of participants. It was organised by the Islamic Movement of Nigeria which was previously a target of the 2015 Zaria massacre.

Iran 
The Arbaeen Remains Walk is held on Arbaeen Day in different cities of Iran. In this program, people who have not been able to participate in main pilgrimage in Iraq, walk through specific routes, usually towards a religious place (such as the tomb of one of the saints) in their cities.

Scholars' observations 
In reference to 2017 Arba'een pilgrimage, head of Iran's Islamic seminaries Ayatollah Alireza Arafi said "Arbaʽeen pilgrimage has truly become a manifestation of unity and brotherhood within Muslim community so much that even followers of other religions have been drawn to it and attend the ceremony alongside Shia Muslims."

Gallery

See also

 Mourning of Muharram
 Ziyarat Ashura

References

Mourning of Muharram
Islamic pilgrimages
Islam in Iraq
Intangible Cultural Heritage of Humanity
Husayn ibn Ali
Muslim martyrs
Karbala